Neal Winston Foster (born May 29, 1972) is a member of the Alaska House of Representatives, representing the 39th District, which is centered on Nome, Alaska.  He has served in the House since November 15, 2009. He was appointed to the House to replace his father, Richard Foster, who had died in office the previous month.  In the 27th Alaska State Legislature, Foster joined along with the other three Democrats from Western Alaska, Bryce Edgmon, Bob Herron and Reggie Joule, as members in the Republican-led majority caucus in the House.

Neal Foster, as was Cathy Muñoz, is a third-generation member of the Alaska Legislature. Foster's grandfather, also named Neal W. Foster (1916–1979) and nicknamed "Willie," served one term in the Territorial legislature during the 1950s and in the State Senate in the 1960s.

See also
 List of Native American politicians

References

External links
 Official legislative page
 Caucus member page
 Neal Foster at 100 Years of Alaska's Legislature

1972 births
21st-century American politicians
Inupiat people
Living people
Democratic Party members of the Alaska House of Representatives
Native American state legislators in Alaska
People from Nome, Alaska
Stanford University alumni
University of Alaska Anchorage alumni